The large moth subfamily Lymantriinae contains the following genera beginning with K:

References 

Lymantriinae
Lymantriid genera K